Harazjan (also Romanized as Harāzjān; also known as Hezār Jān) is a village in Jasb Rural District, in the Central District of Delijan County, Markazi Province, Iran. At the 2006 census, its population was 120, in 54 families.

References 

Populated places in Delijan County